Although the Northern Mariana Islands did not participate in the 2020 presidential election because it is a U.S. territory and not a state, it still participated in the U.S. presidential primaries and caucuses. Senator Bernie Sanders won the Democratic caucus, held on March 14, which would be his last win in the 2020 primary season. The Republican caucus, held on March 15 during the party's commonwealth convention, unanimously voted for incumbent President Donald Trump.

Democratic caucus
The 2020 Northern Mariana Islands Democratic presidential caucus took place on March 14, 2020, a Saturday, in the Democratic Party primaries for the 2020 presidential election and was the only contest to vote on that day, inbetween the two Tuesdays which followed Super Tuesday. The Northern Marianas caucus was a closed caucus and awarded 11 delegates towards the 2020 Democratic National Convention, of which 6 were pledged delegates allocated on the basis of the results of the caucus. The caucus was held at the Saipan World Resort and was organized by the Northern Mariana Islands Democratic Party.

Procedure
When the Northern Mariana Islands Democratic Party had published its draft delegate selection plan in July 2019, it specified a March 14 date for the 2020 caucus.

In the open caucus, candidates had to meet a threshold of 15 percent across the territory to be considered viable. The 6 pledged delegates to the 2020 Democratic National Convention were allocated proportionally as at-large delegates on the basis of the results of the caucus. The March caucus as part of Stage I on the primary timetable received no bonus delegates, in order to disperse the primaries and caucuses between more different date clusters and keep too many states from hoarding on the first shared date or on a March date in general.

The delegation also included 5 unpledged PLEO delegates: 4 members of the Democratic National Committee and one member of Congress, House of Representatives nonvoting delegate Gregorio Sablan.

Candidates 
Several, if not all major candidates participating in the Democratic primaries had been planned for the caucus ballot in Northern Mariana, but with candidates successively withdrawing nationally, the official field for the caucus had been reduced to Joe Biden and Bernie Sanders by March 5 (ignoring the continued candidacy of representative Tulsi Gabbard, which played no role in national polls), with no write-in votes being allowed and an uncommitted option as the sole alternative.

Results

Republican caucus
The 2020 Northern Mariana Islands Republican presidential caucus took place as a commonwealth party convention on March 15, 2020, in the Republican Party presidential primaries and caucuses for the 2020 presidential election. It was a closed caucus, with the territory awarding 9 delegates, all bound to the winner of the presidential preference vote. Afterwards 6 delegates were individually elected, while the other 3 automatic delegates participated at the 2020 Republican National Convention as leaders of the CNMI Republican Party. The caucus unanimously voted to bind the 9 national delegates to incumbent President Donald Trump.

References

External links
The Green Papers Democratic Party delegate allocation summary
The Green Papers Republican Party delegate allocation summary

Northern Mariana Islands
United States presidential elections in the Northern Mariana Islands
Northern Mariana Islands
Northern Mariana Islands
Presidential
Northern Mariana Islands caucuses
Northern Mariana Islands Republican caucuses